Ode to the Goose is a 2018 South Korean drama film written, directed and produced by Zhang Lü. The film stars Park Hae-il, Moon So-ri, Jung Jin-young and Park So-dam. The film had its world premiere at the Busan International Film Festival in October 2018. It was theatrically released on November 8, 2018.

Plot
Yoon-young has been secretly in love with Song-hyun, the wife of a friend. When Yoon-young finds out that Song-hyun is divorced, he decides to take her on a trip to Gunsan. There, they found accommodation at an inn where the owner lives with his autistic daughter who does not leave her room.

Cast
Park Hae-il as Yoon-young
Moon So-ri as Song-hyun
Jung Jin-young as Innkeeper
Park So-dam as Innkeeper's daughter
Jo Young-min as Lee-hyun
Jo Kwang-min as Lee-hyun's younger brother	
Moon Sook as Lily
Myung Gye-nam
Jung Eun-chae
Han Ye-ri
Lee Mi-sook
Yoon Je-moon

Reception
Screendaily'''s Wendy Ide said of Ode to the Goose'': "It's a beguiling, if sometimes bewildering, enigma of a movie. Viewers will likely be intrigued by a formal playfulness and an agility of storytelling which evokes the work of Hong Sang-soo.

References

External links

 

2018 films
2018 drama films
South Korean drama films
Films directed by Zhang Lu
2010s South Korean films